Pork chops and applesauce is a traditional dish in American cuisine consisting of cooked pork chops and apple sauce. The pork chops can be pan-fried, baked or broiled, and the meat is sometimes breaded prior to cooking. Some people consider the dish to be a comfort food.

History
Pork chops and applesauce has been consumed in the United States since at least the 1890s.
In the 1858 play Our American Cousin, attended by Abraham Lincoln on the night of his assassination, the character of Asa speaks the line "Now I've no fortune, but I'm filling over with affections which I'm ready to pour out all over you like apple sass, over roast pork."

In popular culture
The phrase "pork chops and applesauce" became a catchphrase of the television show The Brady Bunch, after the 1971 episode "The Personality Kid" featured Peter Brady (played by Christopher Knight) saying "pork chops and applesauce" while impersonating the voice of Humphrey Bogart. 

In The Simpsons  first "Treehouse of Horror" episode, Homer admonishes Kang and Kodos to "get some applesauce out here for these pork chops", in a scene referencing The Twilight Zone episode "To Serve Man".

See also

 List of pork dishes

Notes

References

Pork dishes
Food combinations
Fruit dishes